2114 Wallenquist, provisional designation , is a Themistian asteroid from the outer region of the asteroid belt, approximately 28 kilometers in diameter. It was discovered by Swedish astronomer Claes-Ingvar Lagerkvist at the Australian Mount Stromlo Observatory near Canberra, on 19 April 1976.

Orbit and classification 

Wallenquist is a member of the Themis family, a dynamical family of outer-belt asteroids with nearly coplanar ecliptical orbits. It orbits the Sun in the outer main-belt at a distance of 2.7–3.7 AU once every 5 years and 9 months (2,090 days). Its orbit has an eccentricity of 0.14 and an inclination of 1° with respect to the ecliptic. The first used observation was made at the U.S. Goethe Link Observatory in 1953, extending the asteroid's observation arc by 23 years prior to its discovery.

Physical characteristics

Rotation period 

In April 2010, a rotational lightcurve of Wallenquist obtained by American astronomer Robert Stephens at the Goat Mountain Astronomical Research Station (GMARS), California, gave a well-defined rotation period of  hours with a brightness amplitude of 0.22 magnitude.

Diameter and albedo 

According to the surveys carried out by the Infrared Astronomical Satellite, IRAS, the Japanese Akari satellite, and the NEOWISE mission of NASA's Wide-field Infrared Survey Explorer, Wallenquist measures between 21.1 and 27.6 kilometers in diameter while its surface has an albedo in the range of 0.08 and 0.15.

The Collaborative Asteroid Lightcurve Link (CALL) derives an even lower albedo of 0.04 and calculates a diameter of 27.5 kilometer. Despite its low albedo, CALL characterizes the body as a S-type rather than a darker C-type asteroid.

Naming 

This minor planet was named in honor of Swedish astronomer Åke Wallenquist (1904–1994), former director of the Kvistaberg Station, after which the minor planet 3331 Kvistaberg is named.

After his retirement Wallenquist continued to research dark matter in open clusters at the Uppsala Astronomical Observatory. He co-discovered the near-Earth Amor asteroid 1980 Tezcatlipoca during his stay at the Palomar Observatory in California in 1950. The official  was published by the Minor Planet Center on 1 February 1979.

References

External links 
 Asteroid Lightcurve Database (LCDB), query form (info )
 Dictionary of Minor Planet Names, Google books
 Asteroids and comets rotation curves, CdR – Observatoire de Genève, Raoul Behrend
 Discovery Circumstances: Numbered Minor Planets (1)-(5000) – Minor Planet Center
 
 

002114
Discoveries by Claes-Ingvar Lagerkvist
Named minor planets
19760419